Miming guitar may refer to:
Air guitar, pretending to play a guitar without holding a real instrument
Miming in instrumental performance, pretending to play a real instrument